The Santa Ana–Orange Line is a former Pacific Electric interurban railway line in Orange County, California. Unlike most of the company's services, trains did not travel to Downtown Los Angeles and instead provided a suburban service between Santa Ana and Orange.

History

The beginnings of the route are traced back to a horsecar line built between The Plaza in Orange and Fourth Street and French Street in Santa Ana by the Santa Ana, Orange & Tustin Street Railway Company around 1887. The Santa Ana & Orange Motor Company acquired the railroad and commenced steam operation in January 1897, which was in turn sold the line to The International Railway Company, which proceeded to sell the railroad to Pacific Electric in 1901. In 1904, Pacific Electric deeded the line to Los Angeles Inter-Urban Electric Railway, who proceeded to rebuild and electrify the route south of Santiago Creek. The new line commenced service on February 10, 1906 — passengers transferred to a steam dummy to complete to trip to Orange. Pacific Electric began operating the line on July 1, 1908, folding it into the system entirely in 1911 as part of the Great Merger.

The segment of the route between Santiago Creek and The Plaza was electrified by July 11, 1914, allowing for through running and retiring the steam dummy. Frequencies generally increased as the line was more heavily trafficked. However, Pacific Electric's purchase of the Motor Transit Company made the line redundant as the latter was running frequent highway bus service between the two cities. The final car departed Santa Ana on September 14, 1930.

Operations
Tracks north of Orange to Marlboro were used by freight trains and saw no passenger service.

Between 1906 and 1914, passengers transferred from normal interurban cars to a steam dummy at Santiago Creek, as the line lacked electrical infrastructure north of this location. Through service was eventually extended as far as The Plaza in Orange

References

External links

Pacific Electric routes
Light rail in California
Railway lines opened in 1887
1887 establishments in California
Railway lines closed in 1930
1930 disestablishments in California
Closed railway lines in the United States